The Super heavyweight boxing competition at the 2014 Commonwealth Games in Glasgow, Scotland took place between 25 July and 2 August at the Scottish Exhibition and Conference Centre. Super heavyweights are boxers who are over 91 kilograms in weight.

Like all Commonwealth boxing events, the competition was a straight single-elimination tournament. Both semifinal losers were awarded bronze medals, so no boxers competed again after their first loss. Bouts consisted of three rounds of three minutes each, with one-minute breaks between rounds. Punches scored only if the front of the glove made full contact with the front of the head or torso of the opponent. Five judges scored each bout; three of the judges had to signal a scoring punch within one second for the punch to score. The winner of the bout was the boxer who scored the most valid punches by the end of the bout.

Schedule
All times are British Summer Time (UTC+1)

Medalists

Results

References

Boxing at the 2014 Commonwealth Games